Time & Faith is an album by the soul musician Jerry Butler, released in 1992. Butler's first studio album in almost a decade, it was recorded during his tenure as a Cook County commissioner.

The album peaked at No. 92 on Billboard'''s Top R&B Albums.

Production
Recorded in Memphis, the album was produced by Danny Jones and Tim Whitsett. It includes covers of Willie Nelson's "Angel Flying Too Close to the Ground", Jimmy Cliff's "Sitting in Limbo", and Curtis Mayfield's "Need to Belong".

Critical reception

The Chicago Tribune noted that "Butler sings about the enduring virtues of adult love like few other singers, and his backing musicians are restrained but soulful-far removed from the synth-drenched wallpaper that passes for R&B these days." USA Today stated that Butler is back to "caressing smooth ballads with his infectious rasp." The Atlanta Journal-Constitution thought that the "title song, with a '90s beat and a catchy little chorus, is almost hypnotic ... [the album is] a hodgepodge of styles, but in the hands of the Ice Man, somehow it gels." The Fort Worth Star-Telegram deemed Time & Faith "a sort of low-key concept album about growing older alone and realizing how hard it is to find lasting love."

AllMusic wrote that "Time & Faith'' is fairly unpredictable; while 'Trying to Break the Habit' is a bluesy soul number, the ballads 'I Was Right About You' and 'You're the Only One' are essentially adult contemporary."

Track listing

References

Jerry Butler albums
1992 albums